The Marietta–Williamstown Interstate Bridge is a four-lane truss bridge carries Interstate 77 between Williamstown, West Virginia and Marietta, Ohio. The bridge was completed in 1967 and it was rehabilitated in 2003.

History

See also
List of crossings of the Ohio River

References

External links
 Marietta-Williamstown Interstate Bridge at Bridges & Tunnels

Road bridges in West Virginia
Bridges over the Ohio River
Marietta, Ohio
Transportation in Wood County, West Virginia
Buildings and structures in Wood County, West Virginia
Bridges in Washington County, Ohio
Road bridges in Ohio
Interstate 77
Bridges on the Interstate Highway System
Truss bridges in the United States